The 2010 Cincinnati Commandos season was the 1st season for the Continental Indoor Football League (CIFL) franchise. The Commandos were able to finish the season with a 9–1 record, and qualified for the playoffs as the 1st seed, where they went on to defeat the Wisconsin Wolfpack in the CIFL Championship Game.

Standings

Regular season schedule

Playoff schedule

Roster

Stats

Passing

Rushing

Receiving

Regular season

Week 1: vs. Miami Valley Silverbacks

Week 3: vs. Marion Mayhem

Week 4: vs. Fort Wayne FireHawks

Week 5: vs. Wisconsin Wolfpack

Week 7: vs. Miami Valley Silverbacks

Week 8: vs. Chicago Cardinals

Week 9: vs. Marion Mayhem

Week 10: vs. Chicago Cardinals

Week 11: vs. Fort Wayne FireHawks

Week 12: vs. Wisconsin Wolfpack

Playoffs

Semifinals: vs. Miami Valley Silverbacks

CIFL Championship Game: vs. Wisconsin Wolfpack

CIFL Awards
MVP - Ben Mauk
Offensive Player of the Year - Dominick Goodman
Co-Defensive Player of the Year - James Spikes
Co-Coach of the Year - Billy Back

1st Team All-CIFL
QB Ben Mauk
RB Greg Moore
WR Dominick Goodman
OL Khalil El-Amin
NT Terrill Byrd
DE James Spikes
DB E.J. Underwood
DB Jeff Franklin

2nd Team All-CIFL
OL Frank Straub
DB Robbie Wilson
K  Travis Johnson
AP Robert Redd

References

2010 Continental Indoor Football League season
Cincinnati Commandos
American football in Ohio